Harry 'Brusher' Mills (19 March 1840 – 1 July 1905) was a hermit, resident in the New Forest in Hampshire, England, who made his living as a snake-catcher. He became a local celebrity and an attraction for visitors to the New Forest.

Life
Harry Mills was born on 19 March 1840 and lived at Emery Down near Lyndhurst until at least 1861.

He took up snake-catching for a living, ridding local properties of snakes, armed with little more than a sack and a forked stick. He is said to have manufactured and sold ointments from parts of the snakes, and other snakes he boiled so that he might sell their skeletons to curious tourists. He supplied snakes, usually Grass Snakes but occasionally Adders to London Zoo as food for their birds of prey, and snake-eating snakes.  It is estimated that he caught tens of thousands of snakes in his lifetime.

Following a national press article about him, Mills became a draw for tourists and visitors to the New Forest, who would have their photographs taken with him, buy his snake potions, and listen to his country lore. He regularly attended cricket matches at nearby Balmer Lawn and was paid to sweep the pitch between innings, and hence the nickname "Brusher" was bestowed upon him.

He lived in this manner for nearly thirty years until he decided to build himself a larger hut. When it was nearly completed it was vandalised. No one was caught, but it is thought that it was destroyed to prevent him claiming squatters’ rights as forest law would allow him to claim ownership of the land on which he had lived for so many years. He took up residence in an outbuilding of one of his favourite pubs, the Railway Inn in Brockenhurst, where he died not long after.

A marble headstone, paid for by locals, was erected over his grave in the churchyard of St Nicholas, Brockenhurst. It includes a carved tableau of him at work, in his distinctive wide-brimmed hat. The Railway Inn where Brusher Mills was a regular was renamed The Snakecatcher.

References

External links

The Snake Catcher (Brusher Mills) - Southern Life
Images of Brusher Mills fgo-stuart.co.uk

1840 births
1905 deaths
People from Lyndhurst, Hampshire